The Men's triple jump event at the 2013 European Athletics U23 Championships was held in Tampere, Finland, at Ratina Stadium on 13 and 14 July.

Medalists

Results

Final
14 July 2013

Qualifications
Qualified: qualifying perf. 16.20 (Q) or 12 best performers (q) advance to the Final

Summary

Details

Group A
13 July 2013 / 12:45

Group B
13 July 2013 / 12:45

Participation
According to an unofficial count, 22 athletes from 14 countries participated in the event.

References

Triple jump
Triple jump at the European Athletics U23 Championships